This list of ship launches in the 16th century includes a chronological list of some ships launched from 1500 to 1599.

References 

16th-century ships
ship
Lists of ship launches